George Wilson Albee (December 20, 1921 – July 8, 2006) was an American academic who was a pioneer in clinical psychology, who believed societal factors such as unemployment, racism, sexism, and all the myriad forms of exploitation of people by people were the major cause of mental illness. He was one of  the leading figures in the development of community psychology. Albee was an advocate for coping with adversity, strengthening individual resources, and social change.

Career
Albee was born in St. Marys, Pennsylvania. He attended Bethany College and graduated in 1943 with a Master’s degree. He was drafted into the Army Air Forces and served until the end of World War II. During his army days, he was exposed to more diversity than what he previously knew from his hometown in Pennsylvania, and with this he was exposed to more diversity in cultures.

After leaving the forces he attended the University of Pittsburgh where he attained his masters and doctoral degrees. Having received his doctorate in 1949 he spent the next two years in a research appointment at Western Psychiatric Institute.  From 1951 to 1953 Albee worked for the central office of the American Psychological Association. He was a distinguished member of PSI CHI International Honor Society for Psychology.

In 1953 Albee went to Finland for a year as a Fulbright scholar, before returning to the US to become a professor at Case Western Reserve University, a post he held for 16 years.  In 1971 Albee left Case Western for a position at the University of Vermont. He remained here until his retirement in 1991. During that time, he married Constance Impallaria, They had four children: Alec, Luke, Marina, and Sarah.

During his career Albee was the author of groundbreaking studies in the 1950s and 1960s, that showed societal factors such as poverty, racism, sexism and child abuse, were to a large degree responsible for mental illness. He believed the psychological profession needed to focus more on prevention, rather than one to one treatment.  After his retirement Albee spent time travelling around the world giving lectures on psychology as well as writing a humor column for his local newspaper the Longboat Observer.

In 1963 he served on the National Institute of Mental Health training grants review committee. One of his responsibilities was to judge the aptness of proposed mental health training programs. From 1969-70 Albee was the president of the American Psychological Association.  During his tenure he negotiated conflicts between the mainstream of psychology and the demands of Black and female psychologists.

During his presidency of the APA, George challenged norms and current wisdom as it pertains to the improvement of humankind’s welfare. George had a way of showing others the social evils of society, that it is exploitation and abuse of power that contributes to the suffering of humans, not just the internal malfunctions. He believed that corporations’ self-interest could override the integrity and activities of the APA.

Prior to becoming president, he served as an assistant executive secretary for the APA, where he was responsible for public information, relations, and placement. In addition to his presidency and secretary positions at the APA, he was also a member of nine of its divisions. Some of these divisions include the Society of Clinical Psychology, Society for Community Research and Action, Society for the Psychology of Women, and Society for the Psychological Study of Lesbian, Gay, and Bisexual Issues.

George was also appointed to be a presidential commission at the Vermont Conference on the Primary Prevention of Psychopathology. He was a hard-working man who devoted his life to the improvement of humankind. Even when he took a sabbatical year, he spent that time at the University of Hawaii School of Public Health.

He was the author of more than 200 articles and book chapters on community approaches to mental illness, as well as writing more than a dozen books. Some of these articles address the prevention of sexism, prevention of psychopathology, and creating a just society. In his article discussing sexism “the prevention of-isms” (1981), he defines sexism and its consequences, as well as describing secondary and tertiary prevention methods to those men and women who suffer as a result of sexism. In his article “preventing psychopathology and promoting human potential” (1982), he addresses primary prevention methods to decrease unnecessary stress and increase social competence, self-esteem, and support networks.

George was a social change agent; he was troubled by the consequences of poverty and other social issues on mental health. One of his greatest missions, was improving the field of prevention of psychopathology. As one of his friends and colleagues, Stephen E. Goldston said that George Albee was the “social conscience of American psychology and that he showed us by word and deed how we could become better human beings.

Albee died after a short illness in Longboat Key, Florida. He is survived by his wife Margeret Tong, as well as his 4 children and 10 grandchildren. He leaves a legacy of encouragement, compassion, courage, and eternal optimism.

Positions and awards
1958 Albee was named the George Trumbull Ladd Distinguished Professor of Psychology.
1988 Albee served on President Dwight Eisenhower’s commission on mental health.
From 1969 – 1970 Albee was the 78th President of the American Psychological Association
1975 received the American Psychological Association Distinguished Professional Contribution Award.
From 1977 – 1978 he was appointed to serve on President Jimmy Carter’s commission on mental health, to be coordinator of the Task Panel on Prevention.
1993 awarded the American Psychological Foundation Gold Medal Award for Life Achievement in Psychology in the Public Interest.
1997 received the Lifetime Achievement Award in Applied Preventive Psychology.

References
1. "World Who's who in Science: A Biographical Dictionary of Notable Scientists ... - Allen G. Debus - Google Books". 1976-12-01. Retrieved 2013-04-22 – via Google Books.

2. Kessler, Marc (2007). "Obituary: George W. Albee (1921-2006)". American Psychologist. 62 (4): 317–318. doi:10.1037/0003-066X.62.4.317. ISSN 1935-990X.

3. Albee, G. W. (2002). "Exploring a controversy". The American Psychologist. 57 (3): 161–164. doi:10.1037/0003-066x.57.3.161. PMID 11905114.

4. https://www.rhodeslab.org/files/mentorgeorgeAlbee.pdf

5. Pachter, W. S., & Deleon, P. H. (2007). Reflections on George Albee’s legacy of promoting human potential and social justice. The Journal of Primary Prevention, 28(1), 45-53. https://doi.org/10.1007/s10935-006-0069-1

6. Goldston, S. E. (2007). George Wilson Albee. The Journal of Primary Prevention, 28(1), 21-25. https://doi.org/10.1007/s10935-006-0067-3

External links
Albee's bibliography at Copac.
The Dell Paperback Collection at the Library of Congress has first paperback editions of Albee's works.

1921 births
2006 deaths
People from St. Marys, Pennsylvania
Presidents of the American Psychological Association
People from Longboat Key, Florida
20th-century American psychologists
United States Army Air Forces personnel of World War II
Case Western Reserve University faculty
University of Vermont faculty
Fulbright alumni